The 1981 Tipperary Senior Hurling Championship was the 91st staging of the Tipperary Senior Hurling Championship since its establishment by the Tipperary County Board in 1887.

Roscrea were the defending champions.

On 25 October 1981, Borris-Ileigh won the championship after a 1-14 to 0-12 defeat of Roscrea in the final at Semple Stadium. It was their fourth championship title overall and their first title since 1953.

Results

Quarter-finals

Semi-finals

Final

Championship statistics

Top scorers

Overall

In a single game

References

Tipperary
Tipperary Senior Hurling Championship